M. Waldo Hatler (January 6, 1894 - August 31, 1967) was a Sergeant in the United States Army during World War I who received the Medal of Honor for heroism near Pouilly, France, November 8, 1918.

Biography
M. Waldo Hatler was born January 6, 1894, at Bolivar, Missouri, elder of two sons of Troy and Rose Hatler. His father was a banker and real estate developer. Waldo graduated from the University of Michigan Law School in 1914 but never practiced law, instead following his father into banking and real estate. He was working in his father's bank at Neosho, Missouri when the United States entered World War I. He attempted to secure a commission in the navy but was turned down for medical reasons. He later waived exemption to the draft and was inducted into the army from Neosho. Assigned to Company B, 356th Infantry, he had risen to the rank of sergeant when, just days before the armistice, his regiment was halted by the enemy in its advance toward Germany at the Meuse River near the French village of Pouilly. Information relative to enemy strength and disposition on the opposite bank was vitally needed and Hatler was one of several men to volunteer.

Extensive biographical and autobiographical information is contained in The M. Waldo Hatler Story, a book compiled and published by in 1968 by his widow Margaret Hatler, using the Ozarkana Book Press (Neosho, Mo.) imprint. 

M. Waldo Hatler is buried at Grand Army of the Republic Cemetery, Sulphur Springs, Arkansas.

Medal of Honor citation
Rank and organization: Sergeant, U.S. Army, Company B, 356th Infantry, 89th Division. Place and date: Near Pouilly, France, November 8, 1918. Entered service at: Neosho, Mo. Born: January 6, 1894, Bolivar, Mo. G.O. No.: 74, W.D., 1919.

Citation:

When volunteers were called for to secure information as to the enemy's position on the opposite bank of the Meuse River, Sgt. Hatler was the first to offer his services for this dangerous mission. Swimming across the river, he succeeded in reaching the German lines, after another soldier, who had started with him, had been seized with cramps and drowned in midstream. Alone he carefully and courageously reconnoitered the enemy's positions, which were held in force, and again successfully swam the river, bringing back information of great value.

See also

List of Medal of Honor recipients
List of Medal of Honor recipients for World War I

References

1894 births
1967 deaths
People from Bolivar, Missouri
United States Army personnel of World War I
United States Army Medal of Honor recipients
United States Army non-commissioned officers
Burials in Arkansas
University of Michigan Law School alumni
World War I recipients of the Medal of Honor
Military personnel from Missouri